Defending champion Roger Federer defeated Lleyton Hewitt in the final, 6–2, 6–4, 6–4, to win the men's singles tennis title at the 2005 Indian Wells Masters. He did not lose a single set in the entire tournament.

Seeds 
All thirty-two seeds received a bye to the second round.

  Roger Federer (champion)
  Lleyton Hewitt (final)
  Andy Roddick (semifinals)
  Marat Safin (third round)
  Guillermo Coria (fourth round)
  Tim Henman (quarterfinals)
  Carlos Moyá (quarterfinals)
  Gastón Gaudio (third round)
  Andre Agassi (quarterfinals, withdrew because of a toe injury)
  David Nalbandian (fourth round)
  Joachim Johansson (second round)
  Tommy Robredo (fourth round)
  Ivan Ljubičić (fourth round)
  Guillermo Cañas (semifinals)
  Nikolay Davydenko (second round)
  Tommy Haas (second round)
  Fernando González (fourth round)
  Mikhail Youzhny (second round)
  Mario Ančić (second round)
  Vincent Spadea (second round)
  Andrei Pavel (third round)
  Juan Ignacio Chela (third round)
  Thomas Johansson (second round)
  Feliciano López (third round)
  Radek Štěpánek (second round)
  Jiří Novák (third round)
  Sébastien Grosjean (second round)
  Dominik Hrbatý (second round)
  Nicolas Kiefer (quarterfinals)
  Taylor Dent (fourth round, retired because of food poisoning)
  Paradorn Srichaphan (third round)
  Jürgen Melzer (third round)

Draw

Finals

Top half

Section 1

Section 2

Section 3

Section 4

Bottom half

Section 5

Section 6

Section 7

Section 8

References 
 2005 Main Draw
 2005 Qualifying Draw

Singles men
Pacific Life Open